Manusela is an Austronesian language spoken in Seram, Indonesia. It is classified by Collins (1983) as a member of the Central Maluku subgroup.

Phonology 

 as well as voiced stops  appear in loanwords from other languages.

References

Further reading

 

Central Maluku languages
Languages of Indonesia
Seram Island